Crank is the sixth studio album by Australian rock group Hoodoo Gurus. It was released in February 1994 and peaked at number 2 on the ARIA charts. The album was produced by Ed Stasium (Ramones, Living Colour, The Smithereens), who had mixed Hoodoo Gurus previous studio album, Kinky in 1991. It was the band's first release on Zoo Records.

EMI re-released the album on 6 February 2005 with an additional nine bonus tracks, a fold out poster and liner notes by Andy Strachan (The Living End). One of the bonus tracks is "Television Addict" which was originally performed by Perth punk band The Victims in 1977 with Gurus' Dave Faulkner known as Dave Flick. "Turn Up Your Radio" originally by Australian band The Masters Apprentices was released in 1995 as a single credited to The Masters Apprentices with Hoodoo Gurus.

Track listing

Personnel 
Credited to:

Hoodoo Gurus 
 Dave Faulkner – guitar, keyboards, vocals
 Rick Grossman – bass
 Mark Kingsmill – drums, rataplan
 Brad Shepherd – guitar, vocals

Additional musicians 
 Vicki Peterson (The Bangles) – background vocals (tracks 9 & 10)
 Wendy Wild – background vocals (track 13)
 Steven MacDonald – role of The Disciple (lead vocals) (one verse of track 10)

Additional credits 
 Cover – Paul McNeill
 Editors – Dave Collins, Pat Sullivan (assistant)
 Engineer – Paul Hamingson
 Mastering – Greg Calbi
 Mixer (assistant) – John Aguto
 Producer – Ed Stasium
 Photo (band) – Andrej Ligur
 Photography – Adrienna Overall
 Recorder (assistant) – Matt Westfield

Charts

Weekly charts

Year end charts

Certifications

References 

Hoodoo Gurus albums
1994 albums
Albums produced by Ed Stasium
Zoo Entertainment (record label) albums